Ulrich "Uli" Stein (born 23 October 1954) is a German former professional footballer who played as a goalkeeper. Between 1978 and 1997, made 512 appearances in the German Bundesliga. He began his career in 1978 with Arminia Bielefeld. After two years, he moved to Hamburger SV where he played from 1980 to 1987. From 1987 to 1994 he played for Eintracht Frankfurt, but in 1994 he returned to Hamburger SV. One year later, he transferred to Arminia Bielefeld again. He retired during the 1996–97 season.

He won the DFB-Pokal (German cup) in 1987 with Hamburger SV and won two German Bundesliga League titles, in 1982 and 1983. The highlight of his career was winning the European Cup (UEFA Champions League) in 1983, with Hamburger SV. He also went on to win the DFB-Pokal with Eintracht Frankfurt in 1988.

He represented the West Germany national team six times between 1983 and 1986. He was a member of the West German squad defeated by Argentina in the final of the World Cup 1986 in Mexico. His international career came to an end when he called West German coach, Franz Beckenbauer a Suppenkasper, meaning laughing stock.

In the DFB-Pokal in the 1986–87 season, in a tie between Hamburger SV and FC Augsburg in the Rosenaustadion, he was given the red card and as he left the pitch, he showed his middle finger to Augsburg's supporters. A more serious incident occurred in 1987 when he punched Jürgen Wegmann of Bayern Munich. Because of this incident, he was fired by Hamburger SV.

He then joined Eintracht Frankfurt, where he played until 1994, when he was fired again. During this period he became one of the most popular goalkeepers ever to have played for the club.

In 2007, he became the goalkeeping coach of Nigeria, in 2008 of Azerbaijan under fellow German Berti Vogts.

Honours
Hamburger SV
Bundesliga: 1981-82, 1982-83
DFB-Pokal: 1986–87
European Cup: 1982–83

Eintracht Frankfurt
DFB-Pokal: 1987–88

External links

References

1954 births
Living people
Footballers from Hamburg
German footballers
Association football goalkeepers
Germany international footballers
Germany B international footballers
1986 FIFA World Cup players
Bundesliga players
Arminia Bielefeld players
Hamburger SV players
Eintracht Frankfurt players
Kickers Emden players
West German footballers
Association football goalkeeping coaches
German expatriate sportspeople in Nigeria
German expatriate sportspeople in Azerbaijan